Wahab Oluropo Adegbenro (5 June 1955 – 2 July 2020) was a Nigerian physician who served two terms as a commissioner for health in Ondo State, Nigeria.

Early life
Abdul-Wahab Oluropo Adegbenro was born on 5 June 1955 at Ilara-Mokin in Ifedore Local Government Area of Ondo State, Nigeria, into a Muslim family. His parents were cocoa farmers.

Adegbenro  had his primary education at Muslim Primary School,  Ilara-mokin in Ifedore Local Government Area of Ondo State. He later attended Oyemekun Grammar School, Akure between 1962 and 1967, before proceeding to obtain his Bachelor of Medicine, Bachelor of Surgery (M.B.; B.S.) degree from University of Benin, Edo state, Nigeria.

Career
Adegbenro established Crown Hospital, Akure where he was the chief medical director.

Adegbenro was appointed vice chairman of the Ondo State Committee on Sports for the Disabled from 1997 to 1999, and later became the chairman of the committee from 1999 to 2002. He was also a director of the Ondo State Waste Management Board from 1999 to 2002 before being appointed commissioner in charge of culture and tourism in Ondo State and then as the state commissioner of health.

Adegbenro was a member of the Nigeria Medical Association; a member of the Association of General and Private Medical Practitioners of Nigeria; an associate member, Royal College of General Practitioners of London; and a member of the Nigeria Guild of Medical Directors.

He was the chairman of the Ondo State Inter-ministerial Committee against COVID-19.

Personal life
He was married to Oluwatoyin Adegbenro, and they had children.

Death
Adegbenro was rushed to the Federal Medical Centre in Owo after contracting the coronavirus. He was said to have suffered from diabetes prior to contracting COVID-19. He died on Thursday 2 July 2020, after spending about 10 days at the hospital.

Upon his demise, the Ondo State Government declared Friday 3 July 2020 a work-free day  and also directed all flags in the state to fly at half mast for seven days to mourn his death.

He was buried on Friday 3 July 2020 at Ilara-Mokin, Ondo State.

References

1955 births
2020 deaths
Deaths from the COVID-19 pandemic in Nigeria
Medical doctors from Ondo State